Klintsy is the name of inhabited localities in Russia, Ukraine and Kazakhstan.

Kazakhstan 
Klintsy, Akmola Region, a village in Burabay District of Akmola Region

Russia 
Urban localities
Klintsy, a town in Bryansk Oblast; 

Rural localities
Klintsy, Kaluga Oblast, a village in Duminichsky District of Kaluga Oblast
Klintsy, Kursk Oblast, a selo in Starshensky Selsoviet of Khomutovsky District in Kursk Oblast
Klintsy, Orenburg Oblast, a settlement in Pobedinsky Selsoviet of Grachyovsky District in Orenburg Oblast

Ukraine 
Klyntsi, Kirovohrad Oblast, a village in Kropyvnytskyi Raion of Kirovohrad Oblast
Klyntsi, Rivne Oblast, a village in Dubno Raion of Rivne Oblast